is a former Japanese football player.

Club statistics

References

External links

1984 births
Living people
Association football people from Shizuoka Prefecture
Japanese footballers
J1 League players
J2 League players
Nagoya Grampus players
Vegalta Sendai players
Association football midfielders